Matthew Savoie (born January 1, 2004) is a Canadian junior ice hockey centre for the Winnipeg Ice of the Western Hockey League (WHL) as a prospect of the Buffalo Sabres of the National Hockey League (NHL). He was drafted ninth overall by the Sabres in the 2022 NHL Entry Draft. 

Following the draft, Savoie was subsequently signed to a three-year, entry-level contract with the Buffalo Sabres on July 16, 2022.

Career statistics

Regular season and playoffs

International

Awards and honours

References

External links

2004 births
Living people
Buffalo Sabres draft picks
Dubuque Fighting Saints players
Ice hockey people from Alberta
National Hockey League first-round draft picks
Sherwood Park Crusaders players
Winnipeg Ice players
Ice hockey players at the 2020 Winter Youth Olympics